Caterina Mieras i Barceló (b. in Majorca 5 April 1947) holds a degree in Medicine and Surgery from UB. She also is Teacher at the Teacher Training School of the Balearic Islands and reached an Upper Grade in piano from the Conservatory of Music of Valencia.

She was one of the founders of the Democratic Students Union at the UB in 1967. Since 1980, she has been an active member of PSC.

Mieras has been teacher as part of the Dermatology services of the Hospital Clínic of Barcelona (1974–1977) and of the Vall d'Hebron Residence (1978–1991).

Lecturer in Dermatology at the Faculty of Medicine of the UAB (1979–1991) and at the University School of Nursing of the Vall d'Hebron Residence (1979–1991).

She has been awarded by The Federation of Progressive Women with the Progressive Woman prize in 1994 for her scientific and social work in the field of AIDS.

She also was town Councillor for Badalona from 1995 to 2003, where she got the responsibility over several areas.

References

1947 births
Living people
Socialists' Party of Catalonia politicians
Culture ministers of Catalonia